This is the results breakdown of the local elections held in Castilla–La Mancha on 22 May 2011. The following tables show detailed results in the autonomous community's most populous municipalities, sorted alphabetically.

Overall

City control
The following table lists party control in the most populous municipalities, including provincial capitals (shown in bold). Gains for a party are displayed with the cell's background shaded in that party's colour.

Municipalities

Albacete
Population: 170,475

Ciudad Real
Population: 74,345

Cuenca
Population: 56,189

Guadalajara
Population: 83,789

Talavera de la Reina
Population: 88,986

Toledo
Population: 82,489

See also
2011 Castilian-Manchegan regional election

References

Castilla-La Mancha
2011